Scaptesyle subtricolor is a moth in the subfamily Arctiinae. It is found on Sumatra.

References

Natural History Museum Lepidoptera generic names catalog

Lithosiini